James Murray Boyd (29 April 1907 – 22 March 1991) was a Scottish professional footballer, who played as an outside right.

Born in Glasgow, Boyd began his career with junior side Petershill before turning senior with Edinburgh side St Bernards. He joined Newcastle United in 1925 and stayed there for ten years, making 214 appearances and scoring 64 goals for the Magpies. During this period he helped his side win the FA Cup in 1932 and earned one cap for Scotland, in 1933; however, the result was a defeat to Ireland and he was one of five in the Scottish team who were not selected for international duty again.

Boyd joined Derby County for £1,000 in May 1935, before moving to Bury then Dundee, both in 1937. He joined Grimsby Town in 1938 and made guest appearances for Clapton Orient and Brighton and Hove Albion during the Second World War. He remained a registered Grimsby player until 1946. He scouted for Newcastle and Middlesbrough after his playing retirement.

Honours
Newcastle United
FA Cup: 1932

References

External links
Rootsweb

1907 births
1991 deaths
Scottish footballers
Footballers from Glasgow
Scotland international footballers
Scottish Junior Football Association players
Scottish Football League players
English Football League players
Newcastle United F.C. players
Derby County F.C. players
Bury F.C. players
Dundee F.C. players
Grimsby Town F.C. players
Petershill F.C. players
St Bernard's F.C. players
Newcastle United F.C. non-playing staff
Middlesbrough F.C. non-playing staff
Association football outside forwards
FA Cup Final players